Health First is a not-for-profit community health system located in Brevard County, Florida. The fully integrated delivery network (IDN) is led by President/CEO Steven P. Johnson.

Founded in 1995, Health First operates four hospitals—Cape Canaveral Hospital, Holmes Regional Medical Center, Palm Bay Hospital and Viera Hospital—and is home to the county's only Level II Trauma Center. Health First also includes Health First Health Plans, which offers a variety of health insurance options across Central Florida, and Health First Medical Group, a multi-specialty physician group. Health First also offers outpatient and wellness services, including fitness centers, home care, hospice care, aging services, and family pharmacies.

Viera hospital
The newest hospital, Viera, opened in 2011. It cost $166 million. It has 100 beds, . There are 250 employees.

The Viera location also has a separate medical plaza where diagnostic tests are performed, the outpatient family pharmacy resides, and multiple provider offices are located.
Also, the Pro-Health and Fitness Center is located next to the hospital and medical plaza.

Procedures
In the year ending June 2010, there were 899 hospitalizations for angioplasty, the most selected surgery. There were 1,000 C-sections, and more than 1,000 knee replacements. Holmes had 228 open-heart surgeries. They cost from $108,377 to $139,040.

References

External links
 

Companies based in Brevard County, Florida
Hospital networks in the United States
Medical and health organizations based in Florida
1995 establishments in Florida